Larissa is an historic town located along Hunter Creek in Douglas County, Missouri, United States. The GNIS classifies it as a populated place. Larissa was located on the north part of the floodplain of Hunter Creek, along county road VV-210, at an elevation of 935 feet. The location is approximately one mile upstream (northwest) of the Crystal Springs fish hatchery.

A post office called Larissa was established in 1888, and remained in operation until 1919. An early postmaster gave the community the name of his wife, Larissa Andrews.

References

Ghost towns in Missouri
Former populated places in Douglas County, Missouri